Zhu or ZHU may refer to:

Zhu (surname), common Chinese surnames
Zhu River, or Pearl River, in southern China
Zhu (state), ancient Chinese state, later renamed Zou
House of Zhu, the ruling house of the Ming dynasty in Chinese history
Zhu (string instrument), ancient Chinese string instrument
Zhu (percussion instrument), ancient Chinese percussion instrument
Zhu (musician), an American electronic music artist
Zhuhai Jinwan Airport - ZHU is the 3 letter IATA code for the airport
Zhu languages
Houston Air Route Traffic Control Center, known as ZHU